Patryk Wolanski (born 15 August 1991) is a Polish professional footballer who plays as a goalkeeper for KS Kutno in the III liga. Besides Poland, he has played in Denmark.

Career
Wolanski started his senior career with Widzew Łódź in the Polish Ekstraklasa, where he made sixteen appearances. After that, he played for Midtjylland, Vejle Boldklub, AC Horsens and in Widzew Łódź again. On October 22, 2020, he joined the amateur Polish klasa B side Sokół Lutomiersk to play an autumn round of the 2020–21 season. He started the spring round as a player of KS Kutno in the III liga.

References

External links 
 
 

1991 births
Living people
Polish footballers
Widzew Łódź players
FC Midtjylland players
Vejle Boldklub players
AC Horsens players
Ekstraklasa players
I liga players
II liga players
III liga players
Association football goalkeepers